Working Girl Blues is an album by the American musician Phillip Walker, released in 1995. It was his first album for an American label in seven years. Walker supported the album with a North American tour. Working Girl Blues was a hit on blues radio formats.

Production
Produced by Hammond Scott, the album was recorded with two different bands, in New Orleans and in Los Angeles. It combined regional musical influences from Louisiana, California, and Texas. Walker employed a horn section on some songs.

The title track was written by Jimmy Johnson in the 1960s. "The Hustle Is On" is a cover of the T-Bone Walker song. "Hello, My Darling" is a remake of Walker's 1959 debut single.

Critical reception

The Edmonton Journal praised the "beautifully crafted" songs that twist "through R&B, swing, blues and country blues, with a zydeco number thrown in for good measure." The New York Times deemed the album "excellent," and noted that Walker "is part of the Texas and Louisiana school of blues."

Guitar Player determined that Walker's "quick bends and slow, plaintive releases tread the elusive middle ground between big Texas blues and West Coast cool." The Los Angeles Times stated that Working Girl Blues "reaffirms his place as a first-rate bluesman in styles ranging from shuffles and stomps to zydeco and ballads."

AllMusic wrote that "Walker remains in fine form on this recent set, a mix of remakes of past triumphs ... and fresh explorations."

Track listing

References

1995 albums
Black Top Records albums